The 2003 Sunderland Council election took place on 1 May 2003 to elect members of Sunderland Metropolitan Borough Council in Tyne and Wear, England. One third of the council was up for election and the Labour Party stayed in overall control of the council.

Campaign
25 seats were contested in the election by a total of 92 candidates, with the Labour Party, Conservative Party and British National Party contesting every seat. With the British National Party contesting every seat the issue of asylum seekers was important in the election, with the British National Party saying that Sunderland had seen a "palpable invasion of asylum-seekers". However Labour, who were defending 21 of the 25 seats, said that in the previous 2 years only 1,800 had been temporarily housed in the city of a population of 289,000. During the campaign a number of prominent people from the North East including the Bishop of Durham Michael Turnbull and the chairman of Sunderland Football Club Bob Murray issued a statement calling on voters to reject the British National Party.

Labour defended their record pointing to an excellent rating in government league tables, having the second lowest council tax in the north east despite a 7.7% rise and to regeneration projects. They targeted the Conservative wards of Hendon and St Peters, but the Conservatives attacked the management of the council for being bloated and said they could bring more efficiency. Meanwhile, the Liberal Democrats contested 13 seats and said there needed to be more opposition councillors to challenge Labour.

The election in Sunderland saw a trial of all postal voting in an attempt to increase turnout. This helped lead to turnout being over double that seen at the 2002 election at 46%.

Election result
The results saw Labour hold control of the council with 63 seats after gaining 2 seats from the Conservatives who were reduced to 9 seats. One of the 2 gains saw the former leader of council, Bryn Sidaway, win Hendon by 39 votes after a recount, regaining the seat that he had lost in the 1999 election. However Labour did lose 1 seat in Eppleton to an independent Colin Wakefield who had stood to represent a Residents Against Toxic Site campaign.

The British National Party failed to win any seats, but did win 13,652 votes, 13.75% of the total and came second in 5 wards. The failure of the British National Party was partly attributed to the increase in turnout due to the all-postal voting.

This resulted in the following composition of the Council:

Ward by ward results

References

2003 English local elections
2003
21st century in Tyne and Wear